Rachel Lang  is a New Zealand television screenwriter, executive producer and actor. She co-created the television series Outrageous Fortune, Go Girls, This Is Not My Life, Mercy Peak, Nothing Trivial, The Blue Rose, and Filthy Rich. She was awarded an MNZM in the 2017 Queen's Birthday Honours for services to television.

Career 
Lang graduated from Toi Whakaari: New Zealand Drama School in 1982 with a Diploma in Acting. Lang's first work in script writing was as a script editor at TVNZ in the 1980s. She worked on episodes of Shark in the Park,  Open House and movie Mark II.

From 1992 until 2000 she worked on Shortland Street, starting as a story liner then moving on to roles as story editor and executive producer. She was the first New Zealander employed as story editor on the show, with previous story editors employed from Australia.

In 1999 she created Jackson's Wharf, one of her first collaborations with Gavin Strawhan. They would go on to work together on Mercy Peak and Maddigan's Quest.

Filmography

Film

Television

Awards

References

External links 

 

Living people
Year of birth missing (living people)
Members of the New Zealand Order of Merit
Toi Whakaari alumni
New Zealand women screenwriters
New Zealand television producers
New Zealand television writers